Shez (Shaz) (born Efrat Yerushalmi on 30 October 1959) is an Israeli writer, poet and playwright. Recipient of the 1999  for Poetry  and the 2007 Prime Minister's Prize for Hebrew Literary Works. She is also a musician and a songwriter, described as "the first out lesbian performer in Israel". More recently she has become a facilitator of writing workshops and "weight loss through writing" workshops.

Early life 
Shez was born in Kiryat Ono to Avraham and Ada Yerushalmi. She was subject to incest, reflected in her poems and books. Trying to distance herself from the past, she changed her name ("Shez" is a Hebrew contraction of Shem Zmani, "temporary name") at the age of 25.

Creative career 
Shez is described as a "provocative and extroverted lesbian" and her poetry is "outrageous, blunt and violent and leaves not even a narrow crack for sentimentality and compassion".

Albums 

2002: Crazy Dance, music album based on the 1999 book
2020: להחזיר את הפיות (Return the Fairies) a music album in cooperation with Jonathan Bar Giora, released by Helicon Records

Books
1996: White Pearl Necklace, a play about childhood sexual abuse<ref>"Talent-spotting for a new Shakespeare in Acre", The Jerusalem Post, 1996 (archived text)</ref> 
1999: The Crazy Dance (ריקוד המשוגעת) - songs
2001: Returning the Fairies to Eretz Israel: A Fake Autobiographical Novel (להחזיר את הפיות לארץ-ישראל)
2005" Tamed (מאולפת) - stories
2010: Away From His Absence (הרחק מהיעדרו), Am Oved Publishing. Written in the first person, it is a novel about the incestous relationship between a father and a daughter. A screenplay by Keren Yedaya based on the book was chosen to take part in a Jerusalem Film Festival. Eventually, it resulted in the  2014 Israeli-French drama film with English title That Lovely Girl'', screened at the 2014 Cannes Film Festival to compete in the section Un Certain Regard.

Awards
2007 Prime Minister's Prize for Hebrew Literary Works.
2004: Hero of Culture Award from the Israeli LGBT community
1999 Ron Adler Prize for Poetry

References

1959 births
Living people
20th-century Israeli poets
21st-century Israeli poets
Israeli lesbian writers
Israeli women poets
20th-century Israeli women writers
21st-century Israeli women writers
Lesbian poets
Israeli LGBT poets
Israeli LGBT dramatists and playwrights
Israeli female dramatists and playwrights
Lesbian dramatists and playwrights